Woodrow Wilson West (born 19 September 1985) is a Belizean  professional footballer who currently plays as a goalkeeper for Verdes FC.

Club career
In February 2008, West was signed by Panamanian side Atlético Chiriquí.

International career

Bribery allegations
In July 2013 he, and fellow international Ian Gaynair, were praised by CONCACAF for reporting an attempt to bribe them ahead of a Gold Cup game against the USA.
He also played for Belize in the 2018 world cup qualifiers.

Honours
 Honduras Progreso
Honduran Liga Nacional (1): 2015 Apertura

References

External links
 
 

1985 births
Living people
People from Belmopan
Belizean footballers
Association football goalkeepers
Belize international footballers
2005 UNCAF Nations Cup players
2007 UNCAF Nations Cup players
2009 UNCAF Nations Cup players
2011 Copa Centroamericana players
2013 Copa Centroamericana players
2013 CONCACAF Gold Cup players
2014 Copa Centroamericana players
2017 Copa Centroamericana players
Atlético Chiriquí players
C.D. Honduras Progreso players
Expatriate footballers in Panama
Expatriate footballers in Honduras
Belizean expatriate footballers
Belizean expatriate sportspeople in Panama
Belizean expatriate sportspeople in Honduras
Liga Panameña de Fútbol players
Premier League of Belize players
Belize Defence Force FC players